Rick Leach and Tim Pawsat were the defending champions, but none competed this year.

Sergio Casal and Emilio Sánchez won the title by defeating Anders Järryd and Michael Mortensen 4–6, 6–3, 6–4 in the final.

Seeds
All seeds received a bye to the second round.

Draw

Finals

Top half

Bottom half

References

External links
 Official results archive (ATP)
 Official results archive (ITF)

Stuttgart Doubles
Doubles 1988